Jake Anthony Wholey (born 1993) is an English footballer who plays as a left back.

Career
Wholey started his career in the youth side with Leicester City. In the summer of 2010 he joined Notts County and made his professional debut on 16 April 2011, in the Football League One 2–0 defeat to Bournemouth at Meadow Lane, coming on as a second-half substitute for Ricky Ravenhill. In February 2013, Wholey joined Ilkeston on loan in the Northern Premier League Premier Division, making six appearances in all competitions. In the summer of 2013 Wholey moved to Swedish Division 3 club Ånge IF. He played for Ånge with his former Notts County teammate Lewis Whiteley. Wholey rejoined Nottingham Forest and was involved in their U21 squad until injury forced him on the sidelines. He was released by Forest in January 2015 and signed for Grantham Town for the remainder of the 2014–15 season.

References

External links

Swedish football stats

1993 births
Living people
Footballers from Nottingham
English footballers
Association football defenders
Leicester City F.C. players
Notts County F.C. players
Ilkeston F.C. players
Ånge IF players
Nottingham Forest F.C. players
Grantham Town F.C. players
Basford United F.C. players
English Football League players
Division 5 (Swedish football) players
English expatriate footballers
English expatriate sportspeople in Sweden
Expatriate footballers in Sweden
Division 3 (Swedish football) players